An Old-Fashioned Christmas is the second Christmas album and posthumous twelfth studio album by American music duo Carpenters, released on October 26, 1984, and after the death of singer and drummer Karen Carpenter.

Background
The album project had its genesis in several unused tracks from the Carpenters' previous Christmas album, 1978's Christmas Portrait. Richard Carpenter took these tracks and recorded new material around them, and this album was the end result. The album includes the slower version of "Santa Claus Is Comin' to Town".

Reissue
A 1984 expanded CD reissue of Christmas Portrait included eight tracks from An Old-Fashioned Christmas. In 1996 a two-CD set, Christmas Collection, was issued containing both albums in their original running order.

Track listing
All lead vocals by Karen Carpenter, except where noted; all tracks produced by Richard Carpenter except "Santa Claus Is Comin' to Town" by Jack Daugherty, R. Carpenter, and K. Carpenter.

Notes
 signifies adapted by

Personnel
Unless otherwise indicated, Information is taken from Lead Sister
Performance
Richard Carpenter - vocals (all on track 1, lead on tracks 3, 8, 11), vocal arrangements (1), musical arrangements (11), piano (4, 13), keyboards, background vocals
Karen Carpenter - lead vocals (tracks 5, 7-8, 10-12, 14), background vocals
Dick Bolks - O.K. Choir director, choir conductor
The English Chorale - background vocals
Robert Howes - English Choir director, choir conductor 
Pete Jolly - keyboards
Skiala Kanga - harp
Peter Knight - musical arrangement (tracks 2-6, 7-9, 12-14)
Gayle Levant - harp
Billy May - musical arrangement (track 10)
Barry Morgan - drums
Joe Osborn - electric bass
Pete Morgan - upright bass
The O.K. Chorale - background vocals 
John "Francis" Phillips - tenor saxophone 
Ron Tutt - drums

Production and technical
Richard Carpenter - producer (All tracks)
Karen Carpenter - producer (track 11)
Jim Cassell - assistant audio mixing 
Jack Daugherty - producer (track 11)
Robert De La Garza - recording engineer 
Ray Gerhardt - recording engineer 
Mike Hatcher - assistant audio mixing 
Clyde Kaplan - assistant audio mixing 
Dave Marquette - assistant audio mixing 
John Richards - audio mixing 
Alan Rouse - assistant recording engineer 
Eric Tomlinson - recording engineer 
Roger Young - recording engineer, audio mixing

Singles

"Santa Claus Is Coming to Town" (A&M SP-1648): US 7-inch single (1974)
"Santa Claus Is Coming to Town"
"Merry Christmas Darling"
"Little Altar Boy" (A&M SP-2700): US 7-inch single (1984)
"Little Altar Boy"
"Do You Hear What I Hear?"

Chart positions

References

1984 Christmas albums
Christmas albums by American artists
The Carpenters albums
Albums produced by Jack Daugherty (musician)
Albums published posthumously
A&M Records albums
Pop Christmas albums